Bab El Khadra is one of the gates of the medina of Tunis, the capital of Tunisia. The original structure, a simple arch erected in 1320 was destroyed and rebuilt in its current form in 1881 by the French colonisers in order to facilitate commerce. It has a distinctly European style and resembles the gates of a European castle.

See also
Bab Saadoun

References

Khadra
Infrastructure completed in 1881